The 1961 Individual Long Track European Championship was the fifth edition of the Long Track European Championship. The final was held on 7 September 1961 in Oslo, Norway.

The  title was won by Timo Laine of Finland.

Venues
qualifying rounds - Marianske Lazne, 14 May 1961
1st semi-final - Scheeßel, 4 June 1961
Semi Final - Mühldorf am Inn, 11 June 1961
Scandinavian final - Örebro, 18 June 1961
Final - Oslo, 7 September 1961

Final Classification

References 

Sports competitions in Oslo
Motor
Motor
1960s in Oslo
International sports competitions hosted by Norway